In the 2005 Austrian Open Singles, Nicolás Massú was the defending champion, but lost in the semifinals to Fernando Verdasco.

Gastón Gaudio won the title, defeating Verdasco 2–6, 6–2, 6–4, 6–4 in the final.

Seeds
All seeds received a bye into the second round.

Draw

Finals

Top half

Section 1

Section 2

Bottom half

Section 3

Section 4

References

External links
 Main draw
 Qualifying draw

Austrian Open - Singles